Wörth am Rhein is a town in the southernmost part of the district of Germersheim, in Rhineland-Palatinate, Germany. It is on the left bank of the Rhine approximately 10 km west of the city centre of Karlsruhe and is just north of the German-French border. Daimler AG's largest truck production plant (2.8 km2) has been located in the town since 1960.

Mayors
 1960–1980: Karl-Josef Stöffler (CDU)
 1980–2016: Harald Seiter (CDU)
 since 2016: Dennis Nitsche (SPD)

Gallery

Notable people
 Ferdinand Brossart (1849–1930), 1915-1923 Bishop of the Diocese of Covington, Kentucky, United States.
 Ludwig Damminger (1913–1981), footballer

Linked to town 
 Kevin Akpoguma (born 1995), German footballe who played in his youth for FC Bavaria Wörth
 Friedel Grützmacher (born 1942), former Landtag deputy (Alliance 90/The Greens) lived in Wörth
 Tobias Lindner (born 1982), Bundestag deputy (Alliance 90/The Greens) who lives in Wörth
 Petrissa Solja (born 1994), table tennis player
 Herbert Wetterauer (born 1957), artist and author who lives in Wörth
 Wynkyn de Worde (unknown birth date; died c. 1534),  printer and publisher in London who was possibly born in Wörth am Rhein
 Marlene Zapf (born 1990), handball player who grew up in Wörth

References

Populated places on the Rhine
Germersheim (district)
Palatinate (region)